Justin Arenstein is a South African journalist, co-founder, and CEO of Code for Africa; Africa's largest network of digital/data journalism labs that exists in 21 countries. Arenstein is recognized internationally as an expert in data-driven journalism and related new media technologies and a Knight fellow of the International Center for Journalists (ICFJ).

References 

Living people
Year of birth missing (living people)